Li Daokui (born 22 December 1963) is a Chinese economist and the Mansfield Freeman Professor of Economics and director of the Center for China in the World Economy (CCWE) at Tsinghua University's School of Economics and Management (SEM), where he teaches courses on economic transition, corporate finance, international economics, and China's economy. In 2013, Li was appointed the founding dean of the Schwarzman Scholars program at Tsinghua.

Li Daokui is a part of an academic trio that replaced Fan Gang to the Monetary Policy Committee of the People's Bank of China (PBOC), China's central bank. He is a former member of the Chinese People's Political Consultative Conference.

Career 
Li has held numerous positions in academia. These include a visiting scholarship at the Center for International Development (CID) of the Harvard Kennedy School (1986), assistant professor at the University of Michigan-Ann Arbor, research fellow at the Hoover Institute of Stanford University, and professor and deputy director of the Economic Development Research Center of Hong Kong University of Science and Technology.

Li has also served as the editor for the Journal of Comparative Economics from 2000 to 2003 and the Economics Bulletin. He returned to China in 2004 to teach at his alma mater, Tsinghua, and to serve as head of the Center for China in the World Economy research center.

From 2016 to 2018, Li was a member of the monetary policy committee of China's central bank. He was succeeded by Dingo Xu on the board of JD.com in 2018. In 2018, he presented for the Academic Center for Chinese Economic Practice and Thinking (ACCEPT) a report by titled "Economic Lessons Learned from China's Forty Years of Reform and Opening-Up". He has written op-eds for The Wall Street Journal on topics like the Asia Infrastructure Investment Bank.

In August 2020, Li stated China could restrict exports of medicine to the U.S. in response to American technology export restrictions on China.

References

1963 births
Living people
People's Republic of China economists
Harvard University alumni
University of Michigan faculty
Academic staff of Tsinghua University
Economists from Beijing
Educators from Beijing
Writers from Beijing
People's Republic of China writers
People from Fengyang